USS LST-922 was an  in the United States Navy. Like many of her class, she was not named and is properly referred to by her hull designation.

Construction
LST-922 was laid down on 26 April 1944, at Hingham, Massachusetts, by the Bethlehem-Hingham Shipyard; launched on 7 June 1944; and commissioned on 29 June 1944.

Service history
During World War II, LST-922 was assigned to the Asiatic-Pacific theater. She took part in the Lingayen Gulf landings in January 1945, the Zambales-Subic Bay operations in January 1945, the Palawan Island landings in March 1945, and the Visayan Island landings in April 1945.

Following the war, LST-922 performed occupation duty in the Far East and saw service in China until early March 1946. Upon her return to the United States, she was decommissioned on 8 July 1946, and struck from the Navy list on 28 August, that same year. On 13 June 1948, the ship was sold to Walter W. Johnson Co., for scrapping.

Awards
LST-922 earned three battle star for World War II service.

Notes

Citations

Bibliography 

Online resources

External links
 

 

LST-542-class tank landing ships
World War II amphibious warfare vessels of the United States
Ships built in Hingham, Massachusetts
1944 ships